Yanlai Temple is a Buddhist temple located on Mount Yingpan in Huangzhou Town of Xinhuang Dong Autonomous County, Hunan, China.

History
In February 2002, Bhikkhunī Shi Yandao came to Mount Yingpan and choose here as the temple address.

Architecture
The complex include the following halls: Shanmen, Mahavira Hall, Hall of Four Heavenly Kings, Hall of Guanyin, Hall of Kshitigarbha, Hall of Sangharama Palace, Hall of Five Hundred Arhats, Bell tower, Drum tower, Hall of Guru, Dharma Hall, Buddhist Texts Library, Dining Room, etc.

The lawn in front of the temple has stones shaped in lifelike arhats of different size in different postures of sitting, lying, sleeping, running and jumping.

Gallery

References

Bibliography
 
 

Buddhist temples in Hunan
Tourist attractions in Huaihua
21st-century establishments in China
21st-century Buddhist temples
Religious buildings and structures completed in 2002